Tonko Vukušić (24 May 1934 – 17 January 2011) was a Croatian professional footballer and coach.

Career  
Vukušić played in the Croatian Republic Football League in 1950 with NK Dinamo Vinkovci. He played with Dinamo until the 1961 season where he later signed with Lokomotiva Vinkovci and retired in 1963 due to injuries.

Managerial career  
Vukušić transitioned into a head coach in 1963 to manage Lokomotiva Vinkovci. In 1982, he returned to his former club Dinamo Vinkovci as head coach in the Yugoslav Second League, and secured promotion to the Yugoslav First League by winning the West Division title. He remained with Vinkovci until the 1985 season and managed FK Vojvodina in 1986 where he secured promotion for the club to the top tier by winning the league. In 1989, he served as the head coach for Toronto Croatia in the National Soccer League. In late 1989, he was named the head coach for NK Osijek in the Yugoslav First League.

In 1991, he returned to manage Dinamo Vinkovci in the Yugoslav Second League. In 1995, he managed in the Croatian First Football League with NK Mladost 127 for two seasons, and returned in the 1998-99 season. In 1997, he returned to former team Dinamo Vinkovci later changed to HNK Cibalia in the Croatian Second Football League. In 1999, he managed in the Croatian Third Football League with NK Kamen Ingrad and secured the league title and promotion to the Croatian Second League. He later became the president of the association of coaches for the Croatian First Football League.

Personal life 
He died on January 17, 2011.

References 

1934 births
2011 deaths
Footballers from Split, Croatia
Sportspeople from Vinkovci
Association football midfielders
Yugoslav footballers
HNK Cibalia players
Yugoslav Second League players
Yugoslav football managers
HNK Cibalia managers
FK Vojvodina managers
Toronto Croatia managers
NK Osijek managers
HNK Suhopolje managers
NK Kamen Ingrad managers
Yugoslav First League managers
Canadian National Soccer League coaches
Croatian Football League managers
Yugoslav expatriate football managers
Expatriate soccer managers in Canada
Yugoslav expatriate sportspeople in Canada